The Canon ELPH 10, released in November 1996, was the lowest-priced camera model in the original ELPH lineup.

Features
It was a compact fixed-focus point and shoot camera using the Advanced Photo System, sold in Europe as the IXUS FF25 and in Japan as the IXY 10.

Lenses
The ELPH 10 featured a 25mm f/6.7 lens, built-in electronic flash, and simple programmed automatic exposure with two shutter speeds.

Cost

Related links

Canon ELPH cameras
Point-and-shoot cameras
APS film cameras